Join the Band is an album by the American contemporary gospel music group Take 6, released in 1994. Join the Band won a Grammy Award for Best Contemporary Soul Gospel Album.

Track listing
"Can't Keep Goin' On and On"
"All I Need (Is a Chance)"
"My Friend" (featuring Ray Charles)
"It's Gonna Rain"
"You Can Never Ask Too Much (Of Love)"
"I've Got Life"
"Stay Tuned (Interlude)"
"Biggest Part of Me"
"Badiyah (Interlude)"
"Harmony" (featuring Queen Latifah)
"4 Miles (Interlude)"
"Even Though"
"Why I Feel This Way" (featuring Stevie Wonder)
"Lullaby"

References

Take 6 albums
1994 albums
Albums produced by David Foster
Albums produced by Stevie Wonder
Reprise Records albums